The 1956 William & Mary Indians football team represented William & Mary during the 1956 NCAA University Division football season.

Schedule

References

William and Mary
William & Mary Tribe football seasons
College football winless seasons
William